The Summer 2015 Tour was a concert solo tour of Europe by English musician Sting, his first one as a solo artist since the Back to Bass Tour in 2011–2013.

Background

Tour dates

References

External links
 Official website

2015 concert tours
Sting (musician) concert tours